This is a list of counties of England, ordered by population as at the 1981 census.

References
1981 census

1981 United Kingdom census
Lists of counties of England